Grega Sorčan (born 5 March 1996) is a Slovenian professional footballer who plays as a goalkeeper for Greek Super League 2 club Apollon Smyrnis.

Club career
Sorčan made his professional debut with Triglav Kranj in a 3–0 loss against Rudar Velenje on 3 August 2013. He briefly transferred to Chievo in the Italian Serie A, before returning to Gorica as a starting goalkeeper.

International career
Sorčan was a youth international for Slovenia.

References

External links
Soccerway profile
NZS profile 

1996 births
Living people
Sportspeople from Kranj
Slovenian footballers
Association football goalkeepers
Slovenia youth international footballers
Slovenia under-21 international footballers
NK Triglav Kranj players
A.C. ChievoVerona players
ND Gorica players
NK Domžale players
Apollon Smyrnis F.C. players
Slovenian PrvaLiga players
Super League Greece players
Slovenian expatriate footballers
Slovenian expatriate sportspeople in Italy
Expatriate footballers in Italy
Slovenian expatriate sportspeople in Greece
Expatriate footballers in Greece